Join may refer to:

 Join (law), to include additional counts or additional defendants on an indictment
In mathematics:
 Join (mathematics), a least upper bound of sets orders in lattice theory
 Join (topology), an operation combining two topological spaces
 Join (sigma algebra), a refinement of sigma algebras
 Join (algebraic geometry), a union of lines between two varieties
In computing:
 Join (relational algebra), a binary operation on tuples corresponding to the relation join of SQL
 Join (SQL), relational join, a binary operation on SQL and relational database tables
 join (Unix), a Unix command similar to relational join
 Join-calculus, a process calculus developed at INRIA for the design of distributed programming languages
 Join-pattern, generalization of Join-calculus
 Joins (concurrency library), a concurrent computing API from Microsoft Research
 Join Network Studio of NENU, a non-profit organization of Northeast Normal University
 Joins.com, the website for South Korean newspaper JoongAng Ilbo
 Joining (woodworking), woodworking processes of combining two or more pieces of wood together, generally through the use of nails or screws
 Joining (metalworking), metalworking processes which combine two or more pieces of metal together, typically by the use of screws or welding

See also
Joiner, a woodworker who makes and installs architectural woodwork
Joinery (disambiguation)
The Joining (disambiguation)
Joint (disambiguation)